The 1976 Lamar Cardinals football team represented Lamar University as a member of the Southland Conference during the 1976 NCAA Division I football season. Led by first-year head coach Bob Frederick, the Cardinals compiled an overall record of 2–9 with a mark of 0–5 in conference play, placing last out of six teams in the Southland. Lamar played home games at Cardinal Stadium in Beaumont, Texas.

Schedule

References

Lamar
Lamar Cardinals football seasons
Lamar Cardinals football